Gervase Lee (died after 1623), of Southwell, Nottinghamshire, was an English politician.

He was a Member (MP) of the Parliament of England for Ripon in 1584.

References

16th-century births
17th-century deaths
English MPs 1584–1585
People from Southwell, Nottinghamshire